Butterworth is an English toponymic surname. It is derived from the former township of Butterworth, Lancashire, England, an area in which the surname was still very common as of 2014.

Notable people who share this surname include:
Aiden Butterworth (born 1961), retired English football player
Albert Butterworth (1912–1991), English professional footballer
Alexander Kaye Butterworth (1854–1946), General Manager of the North Eastern Railway
Allen Butterworth (1939–1974), British archaeology and museum curator
Anthony Butterworth (born 1945), British immunologist 
Archie Butterworth (1912–2005), Irish inventor and racing motorist
Arthur Butterworth (1923–2014), English composer
Benjamin Butterworth (1837–1898), American lawyer and politician
Benjamin Butterworth (cricketer) (1832–1879), Australian cricketer
Bob Butterworth (born 1942), former Florida attorney general
Brad Butterworth (born 1959), yachtsman from New Zealand
Brian Butterworth (born 1944), cognitive neuropsychologist at University College London researching speech, reading and mathematics
Charles Butterworth (actor) (1896–1946), film actor, comedian of the 1930s and 1940s
Charles Butterworth (philosopher) (born 1938), American professor of political philosophy
Donna Butterworth (1956–2018), American actress
Edgar Ray Butterworth (1847–1921), American funeral director
Edwin Butterworth (1812–1848), English topographer of Lancashire
Eliza Butterworth (born 1993), British-American actress
Elizabeth Butterworth (born 1949), English artist
Eugene Butterworth (born 1984), South African rugby union footballer
Frank Butterworth (1870–1950), American football player and coach
Frank Butterworth (footballer) (1914–1999), English amateur footballer
Garry Butterworth (born 1969), British professional footballer
George Butterworth (1885–1916), English composer killed in the First World War
George Butterworth (cartoonist) (1905–1988), British political, strip and sports cartoonist, later a book illustrator
George Butterworth (psychologist) (1946–2000), British professor of psychology who studied infant development
Herbert Butterworth (1902–1938), English professional footballer
Horace Butterworth (1868–1939), American university football coach in 1907
Hugh Butterworth (1885–1915), English cricketer, schoolteacher and soldier
Ian Butterworth (born 1964), English professional footballer
Jack Butterworth, Baron Butterworth (1918–2003), British lawyer
James Butterworth (1771–1837), English author
Jez Butterworth (born 1969), English playwright and screenwriter
Jim Butterworth (entrepreneur), American technology entrepreneur and documentary filmmaker
Jim Butterworth (politician), Habersham County, Georgia Commission Chairman and State Senator
Jon-Allan Butterworth (born 1986), British paralympic cyclist
Joseph Butterworth (1770–1826), English law bookseller and politician
Louise Butterworth (born 1985), English pole vaulter
Luke Butterworth (born 1983), Tasmanian cricketer
Mary Butterworth (1686–1775), Colonial American counterfeiter
Michael Butterworth (born 1947), British author and publisher
Mike Butterworth (1924–1986), British comic book writer
Miriam Butterworth (1918–2019), American educator, politician, and activist
Nick Butterworth (born 1946), British children's author and illustrator
Oliver Butterworth (1915–1990), American children's author and educator
Oliver Butterworth (violinist), British violinist, music educator, and arts administrator
Peter Butterworth (1919–1979), English comic actor
Ryan Butterworth (born 1981), Zimbabwean cricketer
Stephen Butterworth (1885–1958), the inventor of the Butterworth filter
Tyler Butterworth (born 1959), English actor
Wally Butterworth (1901–1974), American radio announcer and host
W. E. Butterworth (1929–2019), who wrote as W. E. B. Griffin
William Butterworth (businessman) (1864–1936), American businessman and early Deere & Company president
William John Butterworth (1801–1856), English colonel and Governor of the Straits Settlements
William Walton Butterworth (1903–1975), American career diplomat and ambassador

References

English-language surnames
English toponymic surnames